Prestons is a suburb on the northeastern side of Christchurch city.

The suburb is named for Thomas Herbert Preston (1824–1884), a local resident and chair of the Avon Road Board. It was first planned as a residential suburb in 2007, and constructed in the 2010s. 

The suburb has a main exit to Preston Road at the north, and a minor one to the east. An exit to the south to reduce congestion has been delayed by disagreements over the intersection design.

Demographics

Prestons had a population of 3,048 at the 2018 New Zealand census, an increase of 2,811 people (1186.1%) since the 2013 census, and an increase of 2,886 people (1781.5%) since the 2006 census. There were 1,137 households. There were 1,485 males and 1,566 females, giving a sex ratio of 0.95 males per female. The median age was 39.8 years (compared with 37.4 years nationally), with 624 people (20.5%) aged under 15 years, 462 (15.2%) aged 15 to 29, 1,428 (46.9%) aged 30 to 64, and 534 (17.5%) aged 65 or older.

Ethnicities were 87.7% European/Pākehā, 8.1% Māori, 1.8% Pacific peoples, 8.8% Asian, and 2.6% other ethnicities (totals add to more than 100% since people could identify with multiple ethnicities).

The proportion of people born overseas was 19.8%, compared with 27.1% nationally.

Although some people objected to giving their religion, 51.4% had no religion, 39.2% were Christian, 1.6% were Hindu, 0.2% were Muslim, 0.5% were Buddhist and 1.8% had other religions.

Of those at least 15 years old, 591 (24.4%) people had a bachelor or higher degree, and 306 (12.6%) people had no formal qualifications. The median income was $43,900, compared with $31,800 nationally. The employment status of those at least 15 was that 1,317 (54.3%) people were employed full-time, 378 (15.6%) were part-time, and 51 (2.1%) were unemployed.

References

Suburbs of Christchurch
Populated places in Canterbury, New Zealand